Lafayette County Courthouse may refer to:

 Lafayette County Courthouse (Arkansas), Lewisville, Arkansas
 Lafayette County Courthouse (Florida), Mayo, Florida
 Old Lafayette County Courthouse, Mayo, Florida
 Lafayette County Courthouse (Mississippi), Oxford, Mississippi
 Lafayette County Courthouse (Missouri), Lexington, Missouri
 Lafayette County Courthouse (Wisconsin), Darlington, Wisconsin